7517 Alisondoane is a dark background asteroid from the inner regions of the asteroid belt. It was discovered on 3 January 1989, by Japanese amateur astronomer Takuo Kojima at the YGCO Chiyoda Station in the northern Kantō region of Japan. It was named after Alison Doane (1958–2017), curator of astronomical photographs at the Harvard College Observatory.

Orbit and classification 

Alisondoane is a non-family asteroid of the main belt's background population when applying the hierarchical clustering method to its proper orbital elements. It orbits the Sun in the inner main-belt at a distance of 1.8–3.1 AU once every 3 years and 10 months (1,397 days). Its orbit has an eccentricity of 0.26 and an inclination of 6° with respect to the ecliptic.

Naming 

This minor planet was named in honor of Alison Doane (1958–2017), curator of astronomical photographs at the Harvard College Observatory. She was also principal oboe with the Boston Philharmonic Orchestra from 1982 to 2001. The  was published by the Minor Planet Center on 25 December 2015.

Physical characteristics 

Alisondoane has been characterized as a carbonaceous C-type asteroid by PanSTARRS photometric survey, as well as by the Sloan Digital Sky Survey (SDSS).

Lightcurves 

A rotational lightcurve analysis by Czech astronomer Petr Pravec in 2007 rendered a rotation period of  hours with a high brightness amplitude of 1.13 in magnitude. A modeled lightcurves using photometric data from various sources, gave a sidereal period of  hours and two spin axes of (123.0°, −51.0°) and (314.0°, −60.0°) in ecliptic coordinates (λ, β).

Diameter and albedo 

According to the surveys carried out by the Japanese Akari satellite and NASA's Wide-field Infrared Survey Explorer with its subsequent NEOWISE mission, Alisondoane measures between 8.52 and 9.99 kilometers in diameter and its surface has an albedo between 0.04 and 0.122. The Collaborative Asteroid Lightcurve Link (CALL) calculates a smaller diameter of 5.16 kilometers based on an assumed albedo of 0.18 for an X-type asteroid.

Notes

References

External links 
 Lightcurve Database Query (LCDB), at www.minorplanet.info
 Dictionary of Minor Planet Names, Google books
 Asteroids and comets rotation curves, CdR – Geneva Observatory, Raoul Behrend
 Discovery Circumstances: Numbered Minor Planets (5001)-(10000) – Minor Planet Center
 
 

007517
Discoveries by Takuo Kojima
Named minor planets
19890103